The Baeksang Arts Award for Most Popular Actress is an award presented annually at the Baeksang Arts Awards ceremony organised by Ilgan Sports and JTBC Plus, affiliates of JoongAng Ilbo, usually in the second quarter of each year in Seoul. 

Before 2018, the winners were announced in both film and television categories. The award is voted by the public and all female acting nominees from film and television categories are eligible. TikTok has held the naming rights for this award since 2020.

List of winners

References

Sources

External links 
  

1985 establishments in South Korea
Awards established in 1985
Baeksang Arts Awards (film)
Baeksang Arts Awards (television)
Film awards for lead actress
Television awards for Best Actress